Louis Gaston Adrien de Ségur (April 15, 1820 – June 9, 1881) was a French bishop and charitable pioneer.

In 1881 he organized the first formal Eucharistic Congress in Lille France which was approved by Pope Leo XIII and was attended by 40,000 people.

Works

 (1851). Réponses courtes et familières aux objections les plus répandues contre la religion.
 (1855). Quelques mots sur Rome, adressés aux soldats de l'armée d'occupation.
 (1856). Qu'est-ce que Jésus-Christ? Considérations familières sur la personne, la vie et le mystère du Christ.
 (1856). Jésus-Christ? Considérations familières sur la personne, la vie et le mystère du Christ.
 (1857). Petite dissertation sur la lampe du Saint-Sacrement.
 (1857). La Religion enseignée aux petits enfants.
 (1858). Causeries familières sur le protestantisme d'aujourd'hui.
 (1858). Prie-Dieu pour l'adoration du Saint-Sacrement.
 (1860). Le Pape, questions à l'ordre du jour.
 (1860). La Très sainte communion.
 (1861). Y a-t-il un Dieu qui s'occupe de nous.
 (1861). La Passion de N.-S. Jésus-Christ.
 (1861). La Révolution.
 (1861). Le Denier de Saint Pierre.
 (1861). L'Eglise.
 (1862). Divinité de N.S. Jésus-Christ, ou Jésus-Christ est-il un Dieu?
 (1862). La Confession.
 (1862). Les Pâques.
 (1863). Le Souverain Pontife.
 (1864). Aux enfants. Conseils pratiques sur la confession.
 (1864). Aux enfants. Conseils pratiques sur la communion.
 (1864). Questions à l'ordre du jour. La Divinité de Jésus-Christ.
 (1864). Instructions familières et lectures du soir sur toutes les vérités de la religion.
 (1864–66). La Pitié et la vie intérieure, par Mgr de Ségur.
 (1865). Aux enfants. Conseils pratiques sur les tentations et le péché.
 (1865). Aux enfants. L'enfant Jésus.
 (1865). Aux enfants. Conseils pratiques sur la prière.
 (1865). Aux enfants. Conseils pratiques sur la piété.
 (1865). A tous les gens de bonne foi. Les objections populaires contre l'Encyclique.
 (1865). Grosses vérités.
 (1866). Au soldat en temps de guerre.
 (1866). La piété enseignée aux enfants.
 (1866). La présence réelle.
 (1867). Aux étudiants et à tous les gens d'esprit. La Foi devant la science moderne.
 (1867). Les Francs-maçons, ce qu'ils sont, ce qu'ils font, ce qu'ils veulent.
 (1867). La Sainte Vierge. Lectures pieuses pour les réunions du mois de Marie, par Mgr de Ségur.
 (1868). Les Volontaires de la Prière.
 (1868). Le Tiers-ordre de Saint-François.
 (1869). Le Concile.
 (1869). Les Saints Mystères, explications familières des cérémonies de la Messe.
 (1869). La Grande question du jour. La liberté.
 (1870). Aux enfants. Une petite sainte de neuf ans.
 (1870). Aux enfants chrétiens. Mois de Marie.
 (1870). Le Pape est infaillible. Opuscule populaire.
 (1871). De la Liberté religieuse pour nos soldats.
 (1871). A ceux qui souffrent.
 (1871). Prêtres et Nobles.
 (1871). Les volontaires de la prière.
 (1871). Les Merveilles de Lourdes.
 (1871). Vive le Roi!
 (1871). Lettre de Mgr de Ségur à M. Louis Veuillot.
 (1872). Pie IX et ses noces d'or.
 (1872). Aux apprentis, avis et conseils.
 (1872). Le Sacré-Cœur de Jésus. Mois du Sacré-Coeur.
 (1872). Le Dogme de l'infaillibilité.
 (1873). Aux pères et mères. L'École sans Dieu.
 (1874). Le Bon combat de la foi.
 (1874). Hommage aux jeunes catholiques libéraux.
 (1874). La France au pied du Saint-Sacrement.
 (1875). Le Cordon de Saint François.
 (1875). La lampe du Saint-Sacrement.
 (1875). A tous les braves gens. Les ennemis des curés, ce qu'ils sont, ce qu'ils disent.
 (1875). Ma mère souvenir de sa vie et de sa sainte mort.
 (1875). Le Cordon séraphique. Ses merveilleuses richesses.
 (1875). Je crois.
 (1875–6). Le jeune ouvrier chrétien, petites directions spirituelles à l'usage des jeunes gens.
 (1876). L'Enfer. S'il y en a un.
 (1876). Les Merveilles de Sainte-Anne d'Auray.
 (1877). Venez tous à moi.
 (1877). Tous les huit jours.
 (1877). Le Séraphique Saint-François, merveilles de sa vie.
 (1882). Cent cinquante beaux Miracles de Notre-Dame de Lourdes.
 (1882). Journal d'un voyage en Italie.
 (1895). Aux Infirmes et aux affligés.

References

External links

 
 

1820 births
1881 deaths
19th-century French Roman Catholic bishops